Acquappesa is a town and comune (municipality) in the province of Cosenza in the Calabria region of southern Italy.

References

Cities and towns in Calabria